Jacqueline Alison "Jackie" Martin (born 4 December 1971) is a road cyclist from South Africa. She represented her nation in the women's road race at the 1992 Summer Olympics and 1996 Summer Olympics.

References

External links
 profile at sports-reference.com

South African female cyclists
Cyclists at the 1992 Summer Olympics
Cyclists at the 1996 Summer Olympics
Olympic cyclists of South Africa
Living people
Place of birth missing (living people)
1971 births